The lesser sooty owl (Tyto multipunctata) is an owl that lives in the wet tropics region of Australia. It is sometimes considered conspecific with the greater sooty owl, Tyto tenebricosa, by some authors. The birds are then together commonly referred to as sooty owl.  Like other birds of prey, the female is bigger than the male. The lesser sooty owl is part of the masked group of owls: an important part of the environment because they are efficient predators that keep down rodent populations.

Diet 
They feed mostly on animals like bandicoots and rodents such as rats, but occasionally eat arboreal animals like birds and squirrel gliders. Lesser sooty owls live long and have low production rates with a breeding season from January to August. They are classified as common even though they have a limited habitat range. Lesser sooty owls are protected animals under Australian law.

References
Wildlife-australia.com

External links

lesser sooty owl
Birds of Queensland
Endemic birds of Australia
lesser sooty owl
lesser sooty owl